Year's Best SF 4 is a science fiction anthology, edited by David G. Hartwell, that was published in 1999.  It is the fourth in the Year's Best SF series.

Contents

The book itself, as well as each of the stories, has a short
introduction by the editor.

Alexander Jablokov: "Market Report" (First published in Asimov's, 1998)
Gregory Benford: "A Dance to Strange Musics" (First published in Science Fiction Age, 1998)
Norman Spinrad: "The Year of the Mouse" (First published in Asimov's, 1998)
Mary Soon Lee: "The Day Before They Came" (First published in Interzone, 1998)
Rob Chilson: "This Side of Independence" (First published in F&SF, 1998)
Stephen Baxter: "The Twelfth Album" (First published in Interzone, 1998)
Ted Chiang: "Story of Your Life" (First published in Starlight 2, 1998)
Robert Reed: "Whiptail" (First published in Asimov's, 1998)
Mary Rosenblum: "The Eye of God" (First published in Asimov's, 1998)
Michael F. Flynn: "Rules of Engagement" (First published in Analog, 1998)
Michael Swanwick: "Radiant Doors" (First published in Asimov's, 1998)
Jean-Claude Dunyach: "Unraveling the Thread" (First published in Galaxies 4 as "Déchiffrer la Trame," 1997)
Dominic Green: "That Thing Over There" (First published in Interzone, 1998)
Mark S. Geston: "The Allies" (First published in F&SF, 1998)
Ron Goulart: "My Pal Clunky" (First published in Analog, 1998)
David Brin: "Life in the Extreme" (First published in Popular Science, 1998)
 Michael Skeet: "Near Enough to Home" (First published in Arrowdreams, 1998)
David Langford: "A Game of Consequences" (First published in Starlight 2, 1998)
Nancy Kress: "State of Nature" (First published in Bending the Landscape: Science Fiction, 1998)
Bruce Sterling: "Maneki Neko" (First published in F&SF, 1998)

External links 

1999 anthologies
Year's Best SF anthology series
1990s science fiction works